Category 1 can refer to:

Category 1 cable, an electrical standard for communications wiring
 Category 1 tropical cyclone, on any of the Tropical cyclone scales
 Cat11egory 1 pandemic, on the Pandemic Severity Index, an American influenza pandemic with a case-fatality ratio of less than 0.1%
 Category 1 winter storm, on the Northeast Snowfall Impact Scale and the Regional Snowfall Index
 Any of several winter storms listed at list of Northeast Snowfall Impact Scale winter storms
 Category 01 non-silicate mineral - native element minerals

See also 
 Class 1 (disambiguation) - class/category equivalence (for labeling)
 Type 1 (disambiguation) - type/category equivalence (for labeling)
 Group 1 (disambiguation) - group/category equivalence (for labeling)
 Category I (disambiguation) - Roman/Arabic numbering equivalence